Yuriy Oleksandrovych Chumak (born 8 April 1962) is a Ukrainian football former goalkeeper and a current Ukrainian Second League club Tavriya Simferopol manager.

He has a son Roman Chumak who also is a footballer.

Career statistics

References

External links
  Club – Official Kremin site
  FC Kremin Kremenchuk Squad on the PFL website
  Profile on the FFU website
  All Players – Official Rostov site
 Profile – KLISF site

1962 births
Living people
Footballers from Dnipro
FC Kryvbas Kryvyi Rih players
FC Kremin Kremenchuk players
FC Rostov players
FC Spartak Ivano-Frankivsk players
FC Prykarpattia Ivano-Frankivsk (2004) players
FC Chornohora Ivano-Frankivsk players
FC Nyva Ternopil players
FC Hirnyk-Sport Horishni Plavni players
Ukrainian Premier League players
Ukrainian Second League players
Ukrainian footballers
Ukrainian football managers
Expatriate football managers in Lithuania
FC Hirnyk-Sport Horishni Plavni managers
FC Kremin Kremenchuk managers
FC Džiugas Telšiai
Ukrainian expatriate football managers
Association football goalkeepers
Ukrainian expatriate sportspeople in Lithuania